Kilroy is a surname of Irish origin. Notable people with the surname include:
 Alix Kilroy (1903–1999), one of the first two women to have entered the administrative grade of the British Civil Service by examination
 Bucko Kilroy (1921–2007), American football player and executive with the New England Patriots
 Howard Kilroy, Irish accountant and businessman
 James Kilroy (politician) (1890–1954), Irish Fianna Fáil politician
 James J. Kilroy (1902–1962), assumed to be the origin of the "Kilroy was here" expression
 Joe Kilroy (born 1960), Australian rugby league player
 Mark Kilroy (born 1968), University of Texas at Austin student who was killed in a human sacrifice ritual in Mexico
 Mary Jo Kilroy (born 1949), American politician and U.S. Congresswoman from Ohio
 Matt Kilroy (1866–1940), American baseball player
 Matthew Kilroy, British Army murderer involved in the Boston Massacre
 Michael Kilroy, Irish politician and coach builder
 Mike Kilroy (1869–1960), former American Major League Baseball pitcher
 Thomas Kilroy (born 1934), Irish playwright and novelist

See also
 Robert Kilroy-Silk, British politician and television presenter

References